The men's 4x50m freestyle relay 20 points event at the 2008 Summer Paralympics took place at the  Beijing National Aquatics Center on 11 September. There were no heats in this event.

Results

Final
Competed at 19:55.

 
WR = World Record.

References
Official Beijing 2008 Paralympics Results: Final

Swimming at the 2008 Summer Paralympics